Perevalnoye is a rural locality (a selo) in Perevalenskoye Rural Settlement, Podgorensky District, Voronezh Oblast, Russia. The population was 384 as of 2010. There are 8 streets.

Geography 
Perevalnoye is located 23 km northwest of Podgorensky (the district's administrative centre) by road. Goncharovka is the nearest rural locality.

References 

Rural localities in Podgorensky District